The Women's uneven bars competition at the 2011 Summer Universiade in Shenzhen, China was held at the Bao'an Stadium on August 16. Yu Minobe and Mai Yamagishi from Japan won the gold and silver, Angelina Kysla from Ukraine took the bronze.

Medalists

Final Results

* Jo Hyun-joo gave up the competition due her injury on all-around final.

References

2011 Summer Universiade events